The Dukes were a British band formed in the late 1970s. The members included singer Miller Anderson, guitarist Jimmy McCulloch, Ronnie Leahy and bassist Charles Tumahai. They toured supporting Wishbone Ash and recorded one album. The band broke up soon after McCulloch died of an overdose.

The Dukes (or the group of musicians that would become The Dukes) also recorded demos with Mick Taylor in 1976. They went on to be backing band for Donovan on a world tour with Yes.

Discography

Albums
The Dukes (Warner Bros., 1979/CD: Wounded Bird Records, U.S. - WOU3376, 2009)

"Hearts in Trouble" - 03:41
"Leaving It All Behind" - 03:08
"All in a Game" - 03:04
"Billy Niles" - 04:00
"Crazy Fool" - 05:05
"Who's Gonna Tell You" - 03:26
"Time on Your Side" - 04:57
"I'll Try to Help" - 04:07
"Heartbreaker" (Vocals by McCulloch) - 03:48

Personnel
Producer: Marty Cohn, Richie Zito
Cover design: Hipgnosis

Singles
"Hearts in Trouble" (1979)

References

Rock music supergroups
British supergroups
Musical groups established in 1979